Douglas Ernest William Harrison (30 March 1903 – 22 February 1974) was an Anglican priest.

Born in Bristol, Harrison was educated at Bristol Grammar School and St John's College, Oxford.  He was ordained in 1926 and was a curate at St John's Waterloo, Liverpool. After this he was Vice-Principal of Wycliffe Hall, Oxford until 1942 and then Archdeacon of Sheffield until his appointment as Dean of Bristol.

He was the Dean of Bristol from 1957 to 1972.

References

1903 births
1974 deaths
People educated at Bristol Grammar School
Alumni of St John's College, Oxford
Archdeacons of Sheffield
Deans of Bristol

20th-century Anglican theologians